The 2019 Southern District Council election was held in Hong Kong on 24 November 2019 to elect all 17 members to the Southern District Council.

The pro-democrats achieved the majority in the council in a historic landslide victory brought by the pro-democracy protests. Kelvin Lam Ho-por, a substitute for Joshua Wong who was disqualified from running, defeated Judy Chan Ka-pui of the New People's Party in South Horizons West.

Overall election results
Before election:

Change in composition:

References

2019 Hong Kong local elections